Just in case we'll never meet again (soundtrack for the cassette generation) is an album by Italian rock band Klimt 1918, released in June 2008. It takes a further step forward in forging Klimt 1918's unique signature sound, leaving completely behind its former metal roots and drawing heavily from post-rock and indie, while maintaining strong new wave influences and the soothing melancholy typically found in the band's works.

Track listing
 "The Breathtaking Days (Via Lactea)" – 3:40
 "Skygazer" – 4:45
 "Ghost Of A Tape Listener" – 4:39
 "The Graduate" – 5:58
 "Just An Interlude In Your Life" – 5:27
 "Just In Case We’ll Never Meet Again" – 3:47
 "Suspense Music" – 4:02
 "Disco Awayness" – 4:06
 "Atget" – 4:56
 "All Summer Long" – 4:33
 "True Love Is The Oldest Fear" – 4:14

Personnel
Marco Soellner – vocals, guitar
Francesco Conte – guitar
Davide Pesola– bass
Paolo Soellner – drums

2008 albums
Klimt 1918 albums